Denny Gulick, born Sidney Lewis Gulick III, is a professor of mathematics at University of Maryland, College Park.

Life
Gulick obtained his PhD from Yale University, with his main interest of operator theory. He is the leader of College Mathematics in Maryland, and is active in statewide college education and policies.

He has written several textbooks, including Encounters with Chaos (1992) and six editions of Calculus with Analytic Geometry, with Robert Ellis.

Works

References

External links
 

American mathematicians
Living people
Year of birth missing (living people)
University of Maryland, College Park faculty
Yale University alumni